State Highway 102 (Andhra Pradesh) is a state highway in the Indian state of Andhra Pradesh

Route 

It starts at SH 40 Junction at Dwarapudi and passes through Tapeswaram, Mandapeta, Draksharama, Yerraporthavaram, Kuyyeru, Kolanka, Injaram, Sunkarapalem and ends at Yanam.

See also 
 List of State Highways in Andhra Pradesh

References 

State Highways in Andhra Pradesh
Roads in East Godavari district
State highways in Puducherry